Frederick Arthur Laws (21 July 1877 – 1 April 1954) was a cricketer who played first-class cricket for Wellington in New Zealand from 1897 to 1910, and one match for Hawke's Bay in 1898.

An opening bowler and middle-order batsman, Laws's best performance came in Wellington's match against the touring MCC in 1906-07. He took five wickets in the drawn match, showing a "promising turn of speed", and top-scored for Wellington with 47 with some bold stroke play. After he retired from playing he became an umpire, standing in one Plunket Shield match in 1912-13.

He also represented Wellington at rugby union, and was later a referee. He worked as a saddler and leather merchant in Wellington, and also sold sporting goods.

References

External links
 

1877 births
1954 deaths
New Zealand cricketers
Wellington cricketers
Hawke's Bay cricketers
Cricketers from Birmingham, West Midlands